Spacey may refer to:

 Kevin Spacey (born 1959), American actor, director, screenwriter and producer
 Marieanne Spacey (born 1966), English footballer
 Spacey Awards, also referred to as the Spaceys, awards presented by the Canadian cable network Space

See also
 Spacey Jane, an Australian indie rock band formed in 2016